Leonard Pond is a lake located in Sevey, New York, USA. The outlet creek flows into the Raquette River. Fish species present in the lake are white sucker, smallmouth bass, largemouth bass, yellow perch and black bullhead. Access is by a trail off State Route 56 on the west shore.

References

Lakes of New York (state)
Lakes of St. Lawrence County, New York